Perfect game may refer to:

Sports
 Perfect game (baseball), a complete-game win by a pitcher allowing no baserunners
 Perfect game (bowling), a 300 game, 12 consecutive strikes in the same game
 Perfect Game Collegiate Baseball League, New York

Film and television
 Perfect Game (2000 film), an American baseball comedy television film
 The Perfect Game, a 2009 American baseball drama film
 Perfect Game (2011 film), a South Korean baseball film
 "Perfect Game" (Attack on Titan), a television episode
 "The Perfect Game" (Arthur), a television episode
 "The Perfect Game" (Daredevil), a television episode

Music
 "Perfect Game" (song), by Thompson Twins, 1981
 Perfect Game Recording Co., an American record label

See also
 Golden set, a tennis term
 Maximum break, a snooker term
 Nine-dart finish, a perfect game of darts
 Perfect Match (disambiguation)
 Perfect play
 List of NFL quarterbacks who have posted a perfect passer rating